Cognitive poetics is a school of literary criticism that applies the principles of cognitive science, particularly cognitive psychology, to the interpretation of literary texts.  It has ties to reader-response criticism, and also has a grounding in modern principles of cognitive linguistics. The research and focus on cognitive poetics paves way for psychological, sociocultural and indeed linguistic dimensions to develop in relation to stylistics.

Topics addressed by cognitive poetics include deixis; text world theory (the feeling of immersion within texts); schema, script, and their role in reading; attention; foregrounding; and genre.

One of the main focal points of cognitive literary analysis is conceptual metaphor, an idea pioneered and popularized by the works of Lakoff, as a tool for examining texts. Rather than regarding metaphors as ornamental figures of speech, cognitive poetics examines how the conceptual bases of such metaphors interact with the text as a whole.

Background 
Prominent figures in the field include Reuven Tsur, who is credited for originating the term,
Ronald Langacker, Mark Turner, Gerard Steen, Joanna Gavins and Peter Stockwell. Although Tsur's original, "precise and particular" sense of the term poetics was related to his theory of "poetry and perception", it has come to be "more broadly applied" to any "theory" or "system" of the workings (Greek poiesis) of literature of any genre.

During the first half of the twentieth century, emphasis was placed on the particular literary text itself. Moreover, concentration on style and linguistic placement of the texts helped to place an importance on the structural patterns prevalent within the literature. However, during this time period, attention to the human interaction aspect of literary analysis was largely unobserved.  

Cognitive poetics, therefore aimed to describe how poetic language and form is naturally constrained and shaped by various human cognitive processes. It allows for the science of cognition and the literary understanding regarding literary texts to both have significance when conducting any literary analytical process. Moreover, cognitive poetics helps demonstrate how ways of expression and ways of conscious perception are mutually inclusive.

The nature of literature involves explaining its function and application in the human mind. Cognitive poetics therefore illustrates just how vital the means of comprehending and analysing literature is to the process of human cognition.

Application

Media and Everyday Life 
While the framework for cognitive poetics was still in its infancy during the 1990s, the internet was simultaneously becoming an increasingly popular academic device for research purposes. This technological advancement enabled a large range of cognitive linguists to share their ideas, and scholarly awareness regarding cognitive poetics globally began to diffuse.

The current technological advancements and adjustments pertaining to the internet, social media, music, film, and television have broadened the definition of literature. Hence, the applicability of cognitive poetics to a wider scope has been realised.

The result of this recent rise in cognitive poetics solidifies the assumptions that the theory views literature as a particular type of the everyday experience, especially cognition that is innate in our general cognitive capabilities for navigating the world. It further establishes the relationship of literature with the human experience and cognition. The theory states that it is due to this relationship that humans are able to interact in these unique methods amongst each other to begin with. The consistent and overlapping nature amongst non-literary and literary backgrounds of language use is especially emphasised through the everyday application of cognitive poetics.

Cognitive-Linguistic Significance   
The close link between knowledge and meaning is essential to establish in cognitive linguistic assumptions. According to these assumptions, language is understood through an individual’s knowledge of the world. In relation to cognitive poetics, this significant relationship is also deemed as crucial assumption for the theory, as this can be applied in terms of the nature and language of literature.

Cognitive linguists use metaphor as an example for the intersection between knowledge and meaning. They explain that the root of metaphor may originate from metaphorical thought, which is described to be a result of an individual’s reflection of their real-world experiences. This highlights another key assumption cognitive linguists’ maintain, that is, language, cognition and experience are closely connected.

Consequently, observing metaphors in this manner helps uncover the contextual background of the writer in question. In cognitive poetics, context is an essential notion for understanding literature.

One example of cognitive poetics using these assumptions is in the literary device of humour. Through the combination of metaphors, and the manipulation of metaphorical schemas, a writer can successfully draw upon the desired emotional response, however more research pertaining to the role of humour and cognitive poetics is needed.

See also 

 Cognitive philology
 Cognitive rhetoric
 Critical theory
 Literary theory
 Evolutionary psychology
 Neuropsychology

References

Bibliography 

 Bachelard, Gaston (1960). La poétique de la rêverie. Paris: Presses Universitaires de France.
 Boyd, Brian. On the Origin of Stories: Evolution, Cognition, and Fiction. Harvard, 2009.
 Brône, Geert and Jeroen Vandaele (2009). Cognitive Poetics. Goals, Gains and Gaps. Berlin: Mouton de Gruyter
 Gavins, Joanna and Gerard Steen (2003). Cognitive Poetics in Practice. London: Routledge.
 Gottschall, Jonathan. The Storytelling Animal: How Stories Make Us Human. Houghton, 2012.
 Semino, Elena and Jonathan Culpeper (2002). Cognitive Stylistics: Language and Cognition in Text Analysis. Amsterdam and Philadelphia: John Benjamins.
 Stockwell, Peter (2002). Cognitive Poetics: An Introduction. London: Routledge.
Tsur, Reuven (2008). Toward a Theory of Cognitive Poetics, Second, expanded and updated edition. Brighton and Portland: Sussex Academic Press.
 Vermeule, Blakey. Why Do We Care about Literary Characters? Baltimore: Johns Hopkins, 2010.
 Wolf, Maryanne. Proust and the Squid: The Story and Science of the Reading Brain. Harper, 2007.
 Zunshine, Lisa.  Why We Read Fiction: Theory of Mind and the Novel. Ohio State University, 2006.
 Stockwell, Peter (2007-08-21). Cognitive Poetics and Literary Theory. 1 (1): 135–152.
 Freeman, Margaret H. (2009-06-29). Cognitive Linguistic Approaches to Literary Studies: State of the Art in Cognitive Poetics. Rochester, NY.
 Stockwell, Peter(2020). Cognitive Poetics: An Introduction. Second Edition. London: Routledge.
 Campbell, Paul(2009).Cognitive Poetics: A Multimodal Approach. semioticon.com. Retrieved 2022-02-19.

Cognitive psychology
Cognitive science
Literary criticism